Hubertus Czernin (born Hubertus Alexander Felix Franz Maria Czernin von und zu Chudenitz; 17 January 1956 – 10 June 2006) was an Austrian investigative journalist.

Born in Vienna on 17 January 1956 to Felix Theobald Paul Anton Maria Reichsgraf Czernin von und zu Chudenitz (1902–1968) and his wife Franziska née Baronin von Mayer-Gunthof (1926–1987), he helped expose the Nazi past of former United Nations Secretary-General and Austrian President Kurt Waldheim.

Career
He wrote initially for the news weekly Wochenpresse. In 1984 he was hired by the Viennese magazine Profil, eventually becoming its editor.

Czernin's investigation of Cardinal Hans Hermann Groër revealed that he had had sex with over 2,000 young men, starting in the 1950s and ending in the 1990s.

Czernin was the first journalist to gain access to records at the Austrian Gallery in Vienna and, in 1998, published a series of articles about the ownership of five famous paintings from artist Gustav Klimt, proving that claims by Austria that they had been donated to the gallery by Ferdinand or Adele Bloch-Bauer were false. The articles led to the passage of Austria's Art Restitution Law, which allowed the family of Maria Altmann, the niece of Ferdinand Bloch-Bauer, along with Altmann's lawyer E. Randol Schoenberg, to pursue claims successfully to the Klimt paintings that had been looted from her uncle during World War II (see Republic of Austria v. Altmann). A United States Supreme Court ruling allowed Altmann to sue the Austrian government for ownership of the multimillion dollar Klimt paintings in the United States. Hundreds of families had looted art restored to them, or restitution made, under the new law.

Czernin was married twice, first to Cristina Teresa Countess Szapáry de Muraszombath Széchysziget et Szapár in 1979 (first cousin to Cristina von Reibnitz, Princess Michael of Kent), ending in divorce in 1981. By his second marriage, to Valerie Countess von Baratta-Dragona, in 1984, he became the father of three daughters.

He died in Vienna of mastocytosis at the age of 50.

Czernin was portrayed by actor Daniel Brühl in the 2015 film Woman in Gold.

Works
Hubertus Czernin. Die Fälschung: Der Fall Bloch-Bauer und das Werk Gustav Klimts. Czernin Verlag, Vienna 2006.

References

Further reading
 Anne-Marie O'Connor. The Lady in Gold: The Extraordinary Tale of Gustav Klimt's Masterpiece, Portrait of Adele Bloch-Bauer. Alfred A. Knopf, New York 2012,

External links
 "Adele's Wish", documentary film on the Bloch-Bauer court case (Republic of Austria v. Altmann)
 Obituary at LA Times

See also 

 The Holocaust in Austria
 List of claims for restitution for Nazi-looted art
 Kurt Waldheim

20th-century Austrian journalists
Counts of Austria
Hubertus
Austrian people of Czech descent
Writers from Vienna
Deaths from mastocytosis
1956 births
2006 deaths
21st-century Austrian journalists